Moon is the debut studio album by American/British duo Snowbird. It was released in January 2014 by Bella Union. The album also contains a bonus second disc, titled Luna, consisting of remixes by RxGibbs.

Track listing

Personnel
Personnel adapted from Moon liner notes.

Snowbird
 Stephanie Dosen – vocals
 Simon Raymonde – piano, electric guitar, acoustic guitar, bass guitar, vibraphone, drums

Additional musicians
 Paul Gregory – guitar (tracks 1, 4, 7, 8, and 11)
 Will Vaughan – orchestration, strings, and harp (track 2), flute (tracks 2 and 7), double bass (track 7)
 Eric Pulido – acoustic guitar (track 6)
 Mckenzie Smith – drums (track 6)
 Jonathan Wilson – guitar (track 4)
 Ol Ketteringham – drums (track 4)
 Steve Honest – pedal steel guitar (track 3)
 Phil Selway – drums (tracks 2 and 8)
 Ed O'Brien – guitar (tracks 5 and 10)

References

2014 albums
Bella Union albums